Jenaro Prieto (1889–1946) was Chilean journalist, writer and politician. He served as a member of the National Congress of Chile for the Conservative Party during the 1930s.

Amongst his best known works as a writer is the novel The Partner (1928) which has been turned into several films.

References

Bibliography
 Salvatore Bizzarro. Historical Dictionary of Chile. Scarecrow Press, 2005.

External links

1889 births
1946 deaths
People from Santiago
Chilean people of Spanish descent
Conservative Party (Chile) politicians
Deputies of the XXXVII Legislative Period of the National Congress of Chile
Chilean male writers